Chad Smith (born January 9, 1974, in Ypsilanti, Michigan) is a retired male decathlete from the United States. He set his personal best score (8133 points) in the men's decathlon on May 17, 2002, in Atlanta, Georgia.

Achievements

References
USATF profile - Chad Smith (Archived). Retrieved on 2010-06-08.

External links

 www.d-a-p-t.com
Owner of Dynamic Athlete Performance in Canton Michigan

1974 births
Living people
American male decathletes
Tennessee Volunteers men's track and field athletes
Sportspeople from Ypsilanti, Michigan